The pallid Atlantic tree-rat (Phyllomys lamarum) is a species of rodent in the family Echimyidae. It is a species of spiny rat. It is endemic to Brazil, where it is found from Paraiba to Minas Gerais.

References

 Woods, C.A. & Kilpatrick, C.W. 

Phyllomys
Mammals of Brazil
Endemic fauna of Brazil
Mammals described in 1916
Taxa named by Oldfield Thomas
Taxonomy articles created by Polbot